The 2004 World Outdoor Bowls Championship men's pairs was held at the Northfield Bowls Complex in Ayr, Scotland, from 23 July to 7 August 2004.

Keith Roney and Ryan Bester of Canada won the gold medal.

Qualifying round
Four sections, three teams from each section qualify for Championship round.

Section 1

Section 2

Section 3

Section 4

Championship round

Section 1

Section 2

Bronze medal match
Wales beat New Zealand 15–9.

Gold medal match
Canada beat Ireland 19–15.

Results

References

Men